Paradrymonia is a genus of plant in family Gesneriaceae. It contains the following species (among 40+ species):
 Paradrymonia aurea Wiehler
 Paradrymonia binata Wiehler
 Paradrymonia fuquaiana Wiehler
 Paradrymonia hypocyrta Wiehler
 Paradrymonia lacera Wiehler
 Paradrymonia lineata (C.V.Morton) Wiehler

 
Taxonomy articles created by Polbot
Gesneriaceae genera